The Americas Zone was one of three Zones of Davis Cup competition in 2005.

Group I

Paraguay relegated to Group II in 2006.
Canada and Ecuador advance to World Group Play-off.

Group II

Bahamas and Cuba relegated to Group III in 2006.
Brazil promoted to Group I in 2006.

Group III
Venue: Club de Tenis La Paz, La Paz, Bolivia (clay)
Date: Week of 28 February

(scores in italics carried over from Groups)

Guatemala and Bolivia promoted to Group II in 2006.
Panama and St. Lucia relegated to Group IV in 2006.

Group IV

Played July 13–17 in San Jose, Costa Rica, on outdoor hard courts.

Results of Individual Ties

Trinidad & Tobago and Costa Rica promoted to Group III for 2006.

See also

 
Americas
Davis Cup Americas Zone